USS Patrick Gallagher (DDG-127) is a planned United States Navy  Flight IIA guided missile destroyer, the 77th overall for the class. She will be named for Lance Corporal Patrick Gallagher (1944–1967), an Irish-born Marine who earned the Navy Cross during the Vietnam War.

Unlike the previous two Arleigh Burke-class ships USS Jack H. Lucas (DDG-125) and USS Louis H. Wilson Jr. (DDG-126) which were inserted into the previous multi-year contract and are planned to be built in the Flight III configuration, Patrick Gallagher was separately added to Navy shipbuilding plans by Congress and will be built in the Flight IIA configuration. Bath Iron Works was awarded the contract for Patrick Gallagher on 28 September 2017 and construction started on 9 November 2018. On 30 March 2022, her keel was laid down at Bath Iron Works.

References

 

Proposed ships of the United States Navy
Arleigh Burke-class destroyers